Graeme Sawyer (born 28 January 1957) is the former Lord Mayor of the City of Darwin, the capital of the Northern Territory, Australia. He became Lord Mayor at an election in April 2008, when he won 56.8% of the vote after preferences. At the 2012 Local Government elections, he was beaten by Katrina Fong Lim, daughter of former Lord Mayor Alec Fong Lim, who received over 56% of the primary vote.
 
Sawyer was a guest on Dirty Jobs during an episode that featured the catching of cane toads, an invasive species in northern Australia.  Sawyer runs an organisation which attempts to control the toad's population.

References 

Lord Mayor's biography. Darwin City Council, accessed 2012-03-11.

External links 
 Official site

Mayors and Lord Mayors of Darwin
1957 births
Living people